The Fung Brothers are a Chinese-American duo consisting of comedians and rappers Andrew Fung (born March 30, 1989) and David Fung (born September 1, 1986), who are brothers born and raised in Kent, Washington, they gained traction in the early 2010s especially due to their YouTube videos regarding NBA player Jeremy Lin, Asian cuisine, and the "626" area of the San Gabriel Valley. They have produced content regarding topics such as: haircut styles, sneakers, men's fashion, hip-hop music videos, Asian stereotypes, Asian masculinity, and responding to Asian discrimination.

They also had a 13 episode TV show on A&E Network's FYI channel entitled Broke Bites: What the Fung?!  However most of their own YouTube content revolves around Asian American subject matter.

With Grandmaster Jason Chu, Andrew and David formed a rap group known as "Model Minority", which has released a mixtape titled Model Minority Report that has been reviewed favorably in The Los Angeles Times. In the rap group, Andrew Fung's stage name is Inglish and David Fung's is D-One. They graduated from University of Washington.

Background
Andrew and David Fung were born in the United States to Chinese parents and grew up in the East Hill neighborhood in Kent, Washington. Their father was born in Guangzhou and raised in Hong Kong, and their mother was of Shandong ancestry born in Shanghai, and raised in China and Japan; specifically Shandong, Shanghai, Hong Kong, and Tokyo.

The Fung brothers attended Kentwood High School. After graduating from University of Washington at Seattle, the Fung brothers decided to settle in the Los Angeles area, initially in Koreatown, and later on in Monterey Park and Alhambra in the San Gabriel Valley of Los Angeles County.

Work

TV shows and food channels
In 2015, the Fung Brothers started hosting a show on the A&E Network's FYI channel entitled Broke Bites: What the Fung?! In the series, Andrew and David travel across the U.S. in search of the best local spots to eat, with a budget of only fifty dollars.

In 2012, they starred on a program on the "Hungry" YouTube channel titled The Fung Brothers Mess With Texas. In this show, they tried restaurant food in various regions of Texas.

Interviews
The Fung Brothers have been making various videos about Taiwanese American NBA player Jeremy Lin ever since he first signed with the Golden State Warriors. Their most popular Jeremy Lin videos are the "Jeremy Lin Effect" series, made during the height of "Linsanity" when Lin joined the New York Knicks, and the videos have been covered by CNN (pointing out that they were the first ones to use the phrase), The Wall Street Journal, The Washington Post, Yahoo! Sports, and Taiwan News Station CTV. The first Jeremy Lin Effect video was directed, produced and edited by Mike Eshaq, and the second one, known as "Linsanity" was directed, produced and edited by Timothy Tau, and the third one, titled "Linsanity Withdrawals," was directed, produced, and edited by Tommy Su. The Fung Brothers wrote and acted in all of them.

In 2020, The Fung Brothers interviewed NFL Ram's rookie Taylor Rapp, about his Asian ancestry and the struggle of being overlooked. In the interview he explained that Jeremy Lin was a big inspiration when he needed encouragement in believing he could make it to the NFL.

David Fung has also interviewed celebrities through a popular Korean website, Soompi.com. Some notable interviews include hip hop group Far East Movement.

Music videos
The Fung Brothers have also released a rap video titled "626" directed by Jason Poon set to the beat of Wiz Khalifa's track, "Young, Wild and Free," that highlights the various Asian restaurants in the San Gabriel Valley area.

They have also done another song titled "Colima Road" about the various Asian food establishments in the Rowland Heights area, directed by Dan Zhao. Another popular viral video that they have done is a music video for a rap they performed titled "Wanking in the Dorm Room" also directed by Dan Zhao.

On February 20, 2013, The Fung Brothers released a music video titled "Bobalife", also directed by Jason Poon, about the Taiwanese drink boba milk tea, which is also known as "bubble tea" or "pearl tea" and is popular among young Asian Americans, especially in the "626" area code. The music video has been covered by the likes of The Huffington Post, 8asians, Angry Asian Man, and more.

In July 2013, the Fung Brothers released a music video for a song titled "Asians Eat Weird Things" on YouTube. The song features vocals from AJ Rafael, and was partially filmed in a 99 Ranch Market store, who they partnered up with for the video.

In July 2014, another music video of the title "Singapore & Malaysia" was released on YouTube. The song portrays the variety of foods and cultures in the Southeast Asia countries, Malaysia and Singapore.

Comedy 
In 2022, David Fung co-starred alongside The Daily Show's Ronny Chieng in a Netflix produced web episode titled "Ronny Chieng Takes Chinatown". The piece featured Jeremy Lin, Simu Liu and has amassed over 1.3 million views on Netflix Is A Joke's YouTube channel.  Later that year, The Fung Brothers performed at the Asian American Comedy Festival, an event organized by Edward Pokropski, in New York City. Other notable comedians in the lineup  included Karen Chee, Yuhua Hamasaki.

Business 
In April 2022, the Fung Brothers joined the advisory board of Legendary Ventures, a venture capital firm with offices in Los Angeles, New York and San Francisco. At the same time, they also launched Fung Brothers Ventures alongside Legendary Ventures to accelerate startups like Posture360 and XFrost.

On August 10, 2022, Andrew Yang joined the advisory team at Legendary Ventures, an early stage venture capital firm, to drive strategic value across the firm's portfolio of consumer retail technology investments, alongside Fung Brothers Ventures.

References

External links 

Fung Brother Comedy on YouTube 
Fung Brothers on Facebook

American comedy duos
American male comedians
American comedians
American Internet celebrities
American musicians of Chinese descent
American people of Chinese descent
American rappers of Asian descent
American people of Hong Kong descent
American investors
Musicians from Seattle
People from Kent, Washington
University of Washington alumni
YouTube channels
Asian American music